Neu! '72 Live! in Düsseldorf is the final entirely new album released to date by krautrock band Neu!.

It was recorded on 6 May 1972 at the congregation hall of St. Maria Unter Dem Kreuz.  Despite the title, it is not a live album in any conventional sense, but instead is a transcription of a cassette tape recording of a rehearsal session. In the liner notes, Klaus Dinger described the recording as a "non-public test/self-audition with Eberhard Kranemann for a series of 6/7 concerts later in '72".  The sound quality of the tape and the resulting CD is generally regarded as poor, with clearly audible tape hiss and distortion.

Overview
During the 1990s, the first three Neu! albums were available on CD on Germanafon Records, a dubious label allegedly based in Luxembourg who specialized in unauthorized and illegal reissues (bootlegs) of otherwise unavailable Krautrock albums. Germanofon managed to get a number of their releases, including the three Neu! albums, into mainstream distribution.  According to Michael Rother's account, Dinger released the previous album, Neu! 4 "in an act of despair, so he says" in late 1995 as a response to the bootlegs without Rother's input, knowledge or consent. Rother, writing in March 2007, described this experience as "a rather painful disaster between Klaus Dinger and myself".

The release of Neu! 4 exacerbated the disagreements between Rother and Dinger, which prevented an official CD release of the three classic Neu! albums until 2001.  Despite this Dinger went ahead with the release of Neu! '72 Live in Düsseldorf in 1996, once again without consulting Rother, further infuriating his former partner in Neu! The CD was issued by the Japanese label Captain Trip Records. A 2000 agreement between Rother and Dinger to finally reissue the first three albums on CD on Astralwerks in the U.S. and Grönland Records in the U.K. called for Neu! '72 Live! In Düsseldorf to be recalled. It has been out of print since then.

In 2010, the recordings were released again in the Neu! Vinyl Box released by Grönland Records. The recordings were heavily edited and remixed by Michael Rother and included as the bonus maxi-single; 6 May 72 - Non-Public Test.

Reception

Reviews for this album are almost unanimous in disparaging it. For example, Stewart Mason, writing for AllMusic, stated, in part:

Rother and many Neu! fans who support his point of view do not consider Neu! 72 Live! In Düsseldorf to be a real Neu! album.

Track listing

Personnel 
Personnel adapted from original liner notes
 Klaus Dinger, Michael Rother, Eberhard Kranemann – performer, composer, improvisations
 Thomas Dinger – recording (cassette), photography
 Klaus Dinger – mastering, editing, artwork, drawing
 Joe Stick - location arranger
 Klaus Dinger and Ira Goldsuit – producer

Musician credits
 Michael Rother – guitar, voice
 Klaus Dinger – drums, voice
 Eberhard Kranemann – bass, voice

References 

 Prog Archives Neu! '72 Live In Dusseldorf.  Retrieved November 8, 2007.

1996 albums
Neu! albums